Henry Brewer Quinby (June 10, 1846 – February 8, 1924) was an American physician, businessman, and Republican politician in the U.S. state of New Hampshire. He was the 52nd governor of New Hampshire from 1909 to 1911 and served in the New Hampshire House of Representatives and the New Hampshire Senate.

Early life
Quinby was born in Biddeford, Maine to Thomas and Jane E. (Brewer) Quinby. He earned a bachelor's degree from Bowdoin College in 1869 and an A.M. degree from Bowdoin in 1872. In 1880, he graduated from the National Medical College in Washington, D.C.

Political career
He served in the New Hampshire House of Representatives from 1887-1888 and in the New Hampshire Senate from 1889–1890. He was on the New Hampshire Executive Council in 1891 and 1892. In 1893, he was a delegate to the Republican National Convention. Quinby was chairman of the 1896 State Republican Convention.

He was elected as a Republican candidate to the office of governor in 1908.  After leaving office, he retired from politics.

He died in 1924 in New York City.

Personal life
On June 22, 1870, Quinby married Octavia M. Cole and they had two children,  Henry Cole Quinby and Candace Ellen Quinby.

References

External links 
 Quinby at New Hampshire's Division of Historic Resources
 New Hampshire Governor Henry Brewer Quinby
 University of New Hampshire Library
 National Governors Association

1846 births
1924 deaths
Bowdoin College alumni
Republican Party governors of New Hampshire
American Unitarians
Politicians from Biddeford, Maine
People from Laconia, New Hampshire
Republican Party members of the New Hampshire House of Representatives
Republican Party New Hampshire state senators